Xiqu is a town in Minqin County, Gansu province, China. , it had 2 residential communities and 33 villages under its administration.
Communities
Xiqu Town Community
Haoshun Community

Villages
Shizhen Village
Shicheng Village
Minzheng Village
Xingfu Village
Minqi Village
Fengzheng Village
Jianli Village
Aiheng Village
Shangzuo Village
Shouhao Village
Beigou Village
Zhichan Village
Fugong Village
Zhixiang Village
Daba Village
Banhu Village
Sanyuan Village
Sanfu Village
Wanshun Village
Dongsheng Village
Shuisheng Village
Dongrong Village
Waixi Village
Juyuan Village
Huokan Village
Xijin Village
Yucheng Village
Zhuming Village
Ziyun Village
Jianggui Village
Jieyu Village
Chuxian Village
Haoshun Village

References 

Township-level divisions of Gansu
Minqin County